Winterborne Whitechurch, also Winterborne Whitchurch, is a village and civil parish in central Dorset, England, situated in a winterbourne valley on the A354 road on the Dorset Downs  southwest of Blandford Forum. In the 2011 census the civil parish had 354 dwellings, 331 households and a population of 757.

History
Evidence of prehistoric human activity in the parish consists of 7 barrows and a linear dyke known as Combs Ditch. The dyke was probably a boundary in the Iron Age but was subsequently modified until it had a more defensive purpose by the end of the Roman occupation. One of the barrows near the dyke was excavated in 1864; one cremation and four inhumations were found, as well as crude arrowheads within a bucket urn. There used to be at least five other barrows but these have been destroyed by more recent human activity.
 
It was in the hundred of Combsditch, and the lord and tenant-in-chief was Milton Abbey.

Medieval settlement remains, formerly part of Whitechurch, lie on either side of the River Winterborne, south of the present village. The remains indicate a change in the village morphology, from original settlement along the North-South river to later settlement along the Dorchester-Blandford Road. The change probably took place over a long period of time but it is likely to have been accelerated in 1752 when the road became a turnpike; even now the process is not complete since West Farm and cottages at Lower Street still represent the former layout. 

The remains consist of twenty-seven long closes, ten on the west side of the river and seventeen on the east.

The parish church, dedicated to St Mary, has a chancel dating to around 1200, a 14th-century crossing and 15th-century south chapel and central tower. The nave was rebuilt in 1844 by Benjamin Ferrey, who also added a south porch and north and south aisles. Until 1933 the church and the western part of the village formed part of neighbouring Milton Abbas parish, resulting in Winterborne Whitechurch church standing outside its own parish.

The non-conformist preacher John Westley, grandfather of John and Charles Wesley, was appointed Vicar of Winterborne Whitechurch by Oliver Cromwell's Commission of Triers in 1658. He was imprisoned for not using the Book of Common Prayer and ejected in 1662, delivering his farewell sermon to a weeping audience on 17 August that year.

Geography
The underlying geology is chalk. The northern part of Winterborne Whitechurch parish is within the Dorset Area of Outstanding Natural Beauty.

Amenities
The village has a federated primary school, Dunbury CofE Academy, for Key Stage Two pupils; Reception and Key Stage One pupils go to a second Dunbury site in neighbouring Winterborne Kingston. The village has a village hall, run by the village hall committee and available for hire. There is a pub in the village called The Milton Arms (closed since 2021). There is a farm shop and tea room in the village. The village has in the past had shops and a pub.

References

External links

Villages in Dorset